Mohabir Anil Nandlall (born 17 February 1976) Guyana's current Attorney General and Minister of Legal Affairs. He previously held this position from 2011 to 2015 under former president Donald Ramotar, before serving as the Shadow Attorney General and Member of Parliament PPP/C when they were in the opposition. After the PPP/C won a long and arduously contested elections in 2020, he was sworn in once again under current President Irfaan Ali.

He is also a practicing lawyer who has represented numerous clients in high-profile cases in Guyana. Nandlall provided legal representation for the PPP/C in court challenges related to the election results, where his persuasive and effective arguments helped secure a victory for the party in the Court of Appeal, which declared the PPP/C the winner of the election.

In a crucial case at the Caribbean Court of Justice (CCJ), which challenged the validity of the election results, Nandlall's advocacy and legal representation were praised by the court. The CCJ noted that his "impassioned and persuasive arguments" were an "outstanding example of legal advocacy." The court ultimately upheld the results of the election and confirmed Irfaan Ali as the new President of Guyana.

Nandlall also provided legal advice to the government and argued in favor of the PPP/C's interpretation of the Constitution in a case related to the requirement for an absolute majority in parliament. The case centered on the interpretation of Article 106(6) of the Constitution, and Nandlall's arguments helped secure a ruling in favor of the PPP/C's interpretation, which found that a simple majority was sufficient for a vote of no confidence against the government.

Nandlall's unwavering commitment, legal expertise, and persuasive advocacy were critical in resolving the legal challenges surrounding Guyana's 2020 elections and upholding the democratic process in the country. His outstanding legal advocacy serves as an inspiration for many aspiring lawyers in Guyana and beyond.

As Attorney General and Minister of Legal Affairs, Nandlall works feverishly on a number of legal and policy issues, including constitutional reform, anti-corruption efforts, and modernizing Guyana's legal system. He also plays a key role in the government's efforts to promote investment and economic development in the country.

References

External links
Mohabir Anil Nandlall LinkedIn page.

1973 births
Government ministers of Guyana
21st-century Guyanese lawyers
People from Georgetown, Guyana
Living people

Attorneys General of Guyana
21st-century Guyanese politicians